Lehman High School was a public high school in the Canton City School District.  It was named for John House Lehman, "in honor of his extensive, untiring, and unselfish efforts for the public school system."

History

Lehman was built on the site of the original North High School in 1920 and served as a junior high until 1932, when it started to add grades above 9th grade. From 1920 to 1937 Lehman was a feeder school to Canton McKinley High School. The first class graduated in 1938.

Due to projections for declining enrollment in Canton City Schools, Lehman and Lincoln High School were closed as traditional high schools at the end of the 1975-76 school year and both buildings became junior highs.  

A new Lehman Middle School was opened in 2004 on 13th St. and Broad Ave. NW, moving the students out of the old Lehman and to the new one. It was used on a temporary basis housing students while several elementary schools in Canton were being razed and rebuilt.

Around 2009, after the district discovered trespassing in the building, they had electricity suspended as a deterrent.

On August 24, 2017, it was added to the National Register of Historic Places.

Athletics
The Lehman Polar Bears were members of the Hall of Fame Conference for football.

Ohio High School Athletic Association State Championships

 Boys Basketball – 1971

References

External links
Canton Lehman Alumni Page
Old Ohio Schools' photographs of the building
Pre-Federal League History, Hoover Vikings Football

Defunct schools in Ohio
Educational institutions established in 1932
Educational institutions disestablished in 1976
1932 establishments in Ohio
1976 disestablishments in Ohio
National Register of Historic Places in Stark County, Ohio